Samuel Bosanquet  (1744–1806) was an English merchant and banker.

Life
Samuel Bosanquet was born into an immigrant family of Huguenots, the son of Samuel Bosanquet (1700–1765) and his wife Mary Dunster. His sister Mary would go on to become one of the first female Methodist preachers.

Bosanquet married Eleanor Hunter in 1767. Charles Bosanquet and John Bernard Bosanquet were their sons.

Career
Bosanquet became a Director of the Bank of England in 1771, was elected Deputy Governor from 1789 to 1791 and Governor from 1791 to 1793. He replaced Mark Weyland as Governor and was succeeded by Godfrey Thornton. Bosanquet's tenure as Governor occurred during the Panic of 1792.

In 1793 Bosanquet resumed his place in the Court of Directors, and remained in this occupation until his death in 1806.

See also
Chief Cashier of the Bank of England

References 
FootnotesBibliography

External links 

1744 births
1806 deaths
British bankers
Deputy Governors of the Bank of England
Governors of the Bank of England
Samuel